Guido Giovanelli (30 November 1901 – 15 May 1975) was a sailor from Italy, who represented his country at the 1928 Summer Olympics in Amsterdam, Netherlands.

References

External links
 

Italian male sailors (sport)
Sailors at the 1928 Summer Olympics – 8 Metre
Olympic sailors of Italy
1901 births
1975 deaths
20th-century Italian people